Mesuli is a South African given name. Notable people with the name include:

 Mesuli Kama, South African politician
 Mesuli Vuba (born 1997), South African cricketer

African given names